"M.A.A.D City" (stylized "m.A.A.d city") is a song by American rapper Kendrick Lamar, from his second studio album Good Kid, M.A.A.D City (2012). The song, which appears as the eighth track on the album, features a guest appearance from fellow Compton native and West Coast rapper MC Eiht. The song was produced by Top Dawg in-house producers THC and Sounwave for the first part of the instrumental, and Terrace Martin for the second part. The song peaked at number 75 on the Billboard Hot 100.

Background 
In the song, Lamar tells the story of his upbringing in Compton and its results. The song features MC Eiht of American gangsta rap group Compton's Most Wanted. The song also features additional background vocals from Lamar's Black Hippy cohort Schoolboy Q, doing his signature ad-lib during the refrain. He also explained "M.A.A.D" is an acronym for  "My Angels on Angel Dust". It is also known as "My Angry Adolescence Divided."

On "m.A.A.d city", Lamar talks about driving down Rosecrans Avenue in Compton, references smoking the PCP-laced blunt that he smoked in "The Art of Peer Pressure," and talks about being fired from his job for a robbery. Lamar also talks about how he saw his uncle being shot at a local burger stand. The song features the violent climatic change in the Good Kid, M.A.A.D City story.

Critical reception 
The song was met with universal acclaim from music critics, praising the production and both rappers' performances. XXL called "m.A.A.d city" the album's "creative and cinematic climax." David Amidon of PopMatters praised the song's production saying, it "feels like Dr. Dre's The Chronic had a love child with Chronic 2001. Andrew Nosnitsky of Spin described MC Eiht's appearance as show stealing. Complex named the song number 25 on their list of the 50 best songs of 2012.

Chart performance 
The week of the October 2012 release of Good Kid m.A.A.d city, "m.A.A.d City" debuted at number 94 on the Billboard Hot 100 due to high downloads. For unknown reasons, the track re-entered the Billboard Hot 100 on the week ending September 8, 2013, at number 98. Following Lamar's performance of the song at the 56th Annual Grammy Awards, the song re-entered the chart, reaching a new peak of number 75 on the chart.

Live performances 
On March 31, 2013, Lamar closed the Good Kid m.A.A.d City portion of Black Hippy's set, at Paid Dues 2013 with "m.A.A.d city". During his Good Kid m.A.A.d City World tour on July 12, 2013, Lamar performed "m.A.A.d city" in Birmingham, England while backed by a live band. Lamar also performed "m.A.A.d city" and "Money Trees" alongside Jay Rock, at the BET Experience concert at the Staples Center in Los Angeles. On September 17, 2013, Lamar performed "m.A.A.d city" on The Arsenio Hall Show, along with Schoolboy Q's single "Collard Greens". On January 28, 2014, Lamar performed "m.A.A.d city" on DJ Skee's SKEE Live. Following that, at the 56th Annual Grammy Awards, Lamar performed "m.A.A.d city" again, along with a remix to "Radioactive", in a mash-up with American rock band Imagine Dragons. Then on February 15, 2014, Lamar performed "m.A.A.d city" and "Bitch Don't Kill My Vibe" on national television, during NBA's All-Star Saturday Night. Lamar has performed "M.A.A.D City" at every show on the Damn tour. It was performed by Lamar in the Super Bowl LVI halftime show on February 13, 2022.

Remixes 
The song was sampled for American singer Cassie's debut mixtape RockaByeBaby (2013), on the song "I Know What You Want". The song was also sampled by Dominican rapper Sensato, for his mixtape La Parte 3 Del 28 (2013), on the song "Back in Business".

Charts

Certifications

References 

2012 songs
Kendrick Lamar songs
Songs written by Kendrick Lamar
Gangsta rap songs
Songs written by Sounwave
Songs written by Schoolboy Q
Songs about California
Songs about violence